The Dallas Texas Temple is the 30th operating temple of the Church of Jesus Christ of Latter-day Saints (LDS Church).  It serves nearly 50,000 members in North Texas, and a few congregations in northwest Louisiana, southwest Arkansas and southeast Oklahoma.

History
Located in Dallas, Texas, the temple was dedicated on October 19, 1984 by Gordon B. Hinckley. The temple sits on a  site and was originally . It was the first temple in Texas and the South Central United States. A groundbreaking, to signify the beginning of construction, occurred in January 1983. With the LDS Church growing rapidly in the area, the temple was remodeled in 1987 to increase its size and make it more functional and efficient. The addition gave the temple  of added space. L. Lionel Kendrick was a former temple president.

In 2020, along with all the church's other temples, the Dallas Texas Temple was closed for a time in response to the coronavirus pandemic.

See also

 Comparison of temples of The Church of Jesus Christ of Latter-day Saints
 List of temples of The Church of Jesus Christ of Latter-day Saints
 List of temples of The Church of Jesus Christ of Latter-day Saints by geographic region
 Temple architecture (Latter-day Saints)
 The Church of Jesus Christ of Latter-day Saints in Texas
 "Dallas Texas Temple", by Hobson, p. 191

References

External links
 Dallas Texas Temple Official site
 Dallas Texas Temple at ChurchofJesusChristTemples.org

20th-century Latter Day Saint temples
Religious buildings and structures in Dallas
Religious buildings and structures completed in 1984
Temples (LDS Church) in Texas
1984 establishments in Texas